All the Way to the Ocean is a 2016 computer animated short film based on the children's book of the same name by Joel Harper. The screenplay was written by Joel Harper, Pete Michels, and Doug Rowell. The film was directed by Doug Rowell and produced by Joel Harper. The film is narrated by American actress Marcia Cross and features the song With My Own Two Hands by Ben Harper (brother of) Joel Harper. This is an alternate version of the original song featuring Jack Johnson and is also featured on the Curious George film soundtrack Sing-A-Longs and Lullabies for the Film Curious George. The lyrics focus on how changes in the world can come about when a single person decides to take action. The song's popularity in Europe was such that Ben Harper was awarded French Rolling Stone Magazine's "Artist of the Year" (Artiste De L'Année) in 2003. The film also features music by Joel Harper and Burning Spear with their collaboration on the song The Time is Now. The film stars voice-overs by actress and activist Amy Smart and Australian musician Xavier Rudd.

Plot
A story about two best friends, Isaac and James (voiced by Katie Leigh), and their discovery of the cause and effect relationship between our cities' storm drains and the world's oceans, lakes and rivers. In the story James throws a wrapper and plastic bottle in the gutter and doesn't believe that it will go all the way to the ocean. His friend Isaac warns James about the consequences of his littering. There begins the adventures of James and Isaac as they learn about the harmful effects of storm drain pollution, and in turn, spread the word to their friends and the rest of their school. Helping the kids along this journey are a concerned Crane (voiced by Xavier Rudd) from the coast line, a surprisingly insightful Surfer Dude and James' Mom (voiced by Amy Smart).

Awards

2022 Sylvia Earle OCEAN CONSERVATION AWARD - Inspiring the Future (My Hero in Partnership with One World One Ocean) https://myhero.com/winner-of-the-inspiring-the-future-2022-sylvia-earle-ocean-conservation-award-all-the-way-to-the-ocean

2017 Official Selection - Wild & Scenic Film Festival.

References

External links
 
 

2016 films
2016 computer-animated films
2010s American animated films
American animated short films
2010s buddy films
2016 short films
2010s children's animated films
2010s English-language films